Tanzler is a surname. Notable people with the surname include:

Carl Tanzler (1877–1952), German-American necrophile
Hans Tanzler (1927–2013), American politician and judge

See also
Tanzer